João Torres, in full João Veloso da Silva Torres (born 24 April 1986, in Porto, Portugal) was a leader of the Socialist Youth, is a former Member of Parliament, former Secretary of State for Consumer Protection in the XXI Portuguese Government, and currently holds the office of Secretary of State for Commerce, Services and Consumer Protection in the XXII Portuguese Government.

A certified engineer, with a Master of Engineering Studies in Civil Engineering by the University of Porto, has a professional record in the area before entering politics, as part of a project management team in a Portuguese construction company.

In late 2012, he run and won for the leadership of the Portuguese Socialist Youth. He was reelected in 2014 for a last term which lasted until 2016. He was elected Member of Parliament representing the electoral district of Porto in 2015, with competencies in the Parliamentary Commissions of Environment; Transparency; Culture, Communication, Youth and Sports; Territorial Planning; and Decentralisation, Local Power and Housing.

As of January 2017, he was nominated Vice-President of the Socialist Party Parliamentary Group. His term as Vice-President and Member of Parliament ended as he entered the XXI Portuguese Government.

In 17 October, João Veloso da Silva Torres, was nominated Secretary of State of Consumer Protection of the XXI Portuguese Government, whose term ended on 26 October 2019.

With the formation of the XXII Portuguese Government as of 26 October 2019, João Torres, was nominated Secretary of State for Commerce, Services and Consumer Protection, office which he currently holds.

References

1986 births
Living people
People from Maia, Portugal
Socialist Party (Portugal) politicians
Portuguese civil engineers
Members of the Assembly of the Republic (Portugal)